Nikolaos Vlachopoulos (1868–1957) was a Hellenic Army officer who rose to the rank of Lieutenant General. He participated in all the Greek wars of the early 20th century, and served twice as chief of the Hellenic Army General Staff, in 1922–24 and in 1927–28.

Biography 
Nikolaos Vlachopoulos was born in Chalkis in 1868. He enrolled in the Hellenic Military Academy and graduated on 9 September 1888 as an Artillery 2nd Lieutenant. He continued his studies in Germany and Belgium, and on his return to Greece served as professor in the Military Academy. During the Balkan Wars of 1912–13 he commanded a field artillery battalion, fighting in the Epirus front during the First Balkan War, and participating many battles of the subsequent Second Balkan War against Bulgaria.

During World War I, having reached the rank of colonel, he served in the Macedonian front as CO of the 4th Infantry Division. Promoted to Major General in 1919, he assumed command of the Athens-based 2nd Infantry Division and led it during the Greek participation in the Allied intervention in the Ukraine against the Bolsheviks. On his return he was appointed as the first military governor of Smyrna following its occupation by Greece, and remained in Anatolia until dismissed from the army following the monarchist victory in the November 1920 elections.

After the defeat of the Greek army in Anatolia by the Turkish forces in August 1922, however, Vlachopoulos was recalled to service and appointed chief of the Army Staff Service, serving until 1924. In the same year he was promoted to Lieutenant General, and served once again as Chief of the Army Staff in 1927–28, when he retired.

Vlachopoulos was a well-educated officer, who spoke fluently German, French, Italian and English. He also wrote an artillery manual for the Military Academy and translated into Greek the book of the German field marshal Colmar Freiherr von der Goltz on the Greco-Turkish War of 1897. 

He was married with two children, and died in 1957.

References

1868 births
1957 deaths
20th-century Greek people
Hellenic Army generals
Chiefs of the Hellenic Army General Staff
Greek military personnel of World War I
Greek military personnel of the Greco-Turkish War (1919–1922)
People from Chalcis
Greek military personnel of the Russian Civil War
Greek military personnel of the Balkan Wars